Viagogo, stylized by the company as viagogo, is a multinational ticket exchange and ticket resale brand. It is headquartered in the United States and owned by StubHub Holdings since 2021. It was founded in London in 2006 by Eric Baker as an online marketplace for consumers to buy and sell tickets to sports, music, theatre and comedy events.

Viagogo is backed by investors such as Index Ventures, Brent Hoberman, and Jacob Rothschild. In February 2020 the company purchased StubHub for $4 billion with the merging process finalized in 2022.

The company has been criticized for inflation via ticket resale, lacking transparency, and in some cases, having sold counterfeit tickets. These controversies have led to legal action in some of the countries where Viagogo operates, and also led the UK Competition & Markets Authority to order changes to Viagogo's operations.

History

2006-2011
Viagogo was founded in 2006 in London as a secondary ticketing marketplace by Eric Baker, the co-founder of US-based StubHub. With sections established to provide an online marketplace for sports, music, theatre and comedy tickets, the company's launch included official partnerships with Chelsea FC and Manchester United FC, with the sports clubs sharing in the commission revenue on ticket resales. 

As unauthorized reselling of football tickets was illegal under British law in 2006, Viagogo's official reselling authorizations with Chelsea FC and Manchester United FC marked the first time Premier League tickets were legally resold in the United Kingdom. Manchester United ended its commercial agreement with Viagogo in 2011, also ending official resale of its season tickets in the process.

By 2006 Viagogo was backed by venture capital investment firm Index Ventures as well as Brent Hoberman and Jacob Rothschild, 4th Baron Rothschild. Officially debuting in the United Kingdom on August 18, 2006 as an online ticket exchange designed to bypass physical ticket resale, Viagogo stated it offered users more protection than competitors such as eBay by guaranteeing refunds for tickets that were fake or didn't arrive.

In August 2007, Viagogo branched into Germany partnered with Bayern Munich. With Baker as CEO, Viagogo raised £30 million in August 2007 from investors including Brent Hoberman, Bernard Arnault, Jacob Rothschild, and Index Ventures. Viagogo had local sites in Germany, Holland, and Hammersmith, London by 2008. Viagogo by that January had traded £50 million in tickets overall and signed deals with Warner Music and James Blunt. 

In May 2008, Live Nation hired Viagogo as one of its ticket sellers in Europe for Madonna's Sticky & Sweet tour. Also in 2008, the French Tennis Federation appointed Viagogo the official ticket marketplace of the French Open. Baker stated the company sold $100 million in tickets in 2008, with the company making 25% of that. By June 2009, new investors included Andre Agassi, bringing total funds raised to $70 million. Viagogo was also an official resale partner of Michael Jackson, Lloyd-Webber's Really Useful Group, and the ATP World Tour Finals. According to The Guardian, "a fundraising effort in 2009 valued the company at $300m".

2012-2019
The company liquidated its UK assets in 2012 and moved its headquarters to Switzerland, where its financial accounts are private. The change, which occurred directly before the London Olympic Games, meant Viagogo "was no longer subject to UK laws banning resale of tickets for Olympic events."

Also in 2012, Madonna named Viagogo the "official premium and secondary ticketing partner" for her summer European tour. By then Viagogo had also officially partnered with the promoters of musicians such as Rihanna, Coldplay, Westlife, and Take That. In September 2013, Viagogo launched in Australia. The launch was accompanied by two new partnerships with Melbourne-based AFL clubs Collingwood and Richmond. Between 2013 and 2015 it also partnered with the Sydney Swans and Sydney Roosters.

Viagogo was the official ticket marketplace for the various music festivals in 2013, including the Isle of Wight Festival, the Boyzone 20th Anniversary Tour, the Benicàssim Festival and Weekend Festival. In 2014, Viagogo partnered with SFX Entertainment and in 2015 with the Australian Soundwave festival, and Ultra Beach Bali. In 2016, Viagogo was announced as the official ticketing partner of Ultra Singapore 2016.

In March 2012 in the UK, Labour MP Sharon Hodgson's proposal that legislation be introduced to cap resale prices at 10% higher than their face value was rejected by the Department for Digital, Culture, Media and Sport leaving Viagogo free to continue operating in the country without price caps. That year Viagogo extended its European ticketing agreement with ESPN.

In October 2013, Viagogo announced a three-year deal with Scottish Rugby, in what was the first time Viagogo had partnered with a governing sports body, and its first deal including naming rights to a sports property. In December, Viagogo entered the Portuguese market through a partnership with soccer club FC Porto, joining Chelsea, Bayern Munich and Paris Saint-Germain in "partnering the ticket marketplace" at the time. 

Viagogo signed a $75 million sponsorship deal with SFX Entertainment in 2014, with Viagogo buying exclusive rights to be the designated ticket reseller for around 50 SFX events.  In November 2015, Viagogo became the official international ticketing partner of the Indian Aces of the International Premier Tennis League, at which point it had 60 global websites.

By 2016, Viagogo had secured investments from Robin Klein. As of March 2017, Viagogo was owned by Pugnacious Endeavors, which was headquartered in Dover, Delaware in the United States. Viagogo remained technically based in Geneva, while administering much of its business from an office in London. 

After a website "glitch" reportedly overcharged dozens of UK customers, in 2017 Viagogo was criticized for allegedly denying prompt refunds. In February 2018, Viagogo was found to have been marketing tickets for a non-existent performance by a Hungarian stand-up comedian for about twice the normal price.
By 2012, Viagogo's ticket pricing policy had become a frequent subject of controversy in the United Kingdom. After a number of Mumford & Sons tickets, one reportedly marked up from face value of £23.50 to £200, proved invalid in November 2012, Viagogo assured the BBC that it was a rare occurrence and the tickets would be refunded or replaced.

In August 2018, it was reported that Viagogo was preparing to move much of its workforce in the United Kingdom to New York. In November 2019, Viagogo operated in 70 countries and was particularly popular in Europe.

In March 2019, the Department for Digital, Culture, Media and Sport warned consumers not to buy or sell tickets through Viagogo. In July 2019, Google ceased paid advertising by Viagogo for breaching Google's internal advertising policies. Google resumed advertising for Viagogo in November 2019, after Viagogo made "suitable changes to their account."

In November 2019, StubHub disclosed having sold $4.75 billion in tickets in 2018 with $1.1 billion in annual fees, while Viagogo had not disclosed its financial details. Based in Geneva, Switzerland, Viagogo operated in 70 countries and was particularly popular in Europe and Britain, while StubHub sold tickets in 44 countries and was most popular in the United States.

2020-2022
As of 2020, Viagogo's majority owners included Madrone Capital Partners, Bessemer Venture Partners, and CEO Eric Baker, who held majority voting control. Viagogo retained offices in New York and London and employed 616 people in Europe, Asia, and the United States. After announcing its intent to purchase StubHub from eBay in late 2019, Viagogo agreed to purchase StubHub for $4 billion in February 2020, with Viagogo's owner Pugnacious LLC to become the holding company for both. The deal was put on hold in 2020 by the Competition & Markets Authority (CMA) over competition concerns, as combined, the two companies held a 90% market share of secondary ticketing in the United Kingdom.

As part of the deal, StubHub agreed to sell its business outside of North America, including its UK business, to Digital Fuel Capital LLC. Through the merger, Viagogo and StubHub became owned by the new entity StubHub Holdings.

In early 2020, the live events industry was shut down due to the coronavirus pandemic, with Viagogo Group significantly reducing its Limerick, Ireland workforce as a result. Viagogo took on a $330 million loan in late 2020 in response to the industry shutdowns, allowing the company "to operate with little to no revenue" until 2022 if needed, according to Moody's. In July 2021, Moody's reported that Viagogo had been "free cash flow positive" since April 2021.

In January 2022, it was reported that StubHub Holdings was considering an IPO and had filed with the US Securities and Exchange Commission. In early 2022, StubHub Holding employed 650 full-time people, with a third of those employees at Viagogo. 

In July 2022, Viagogo and StubHub announced that they would be closing their San Francisco and Shanghai offices by 2023, with a new focus to be placed on Los Angeles and New York. Offices would also remain in Switzerland, Ireland, Taiwan, and Utah. In 2022, the StubHub brand migrated all of its systems and technology onto Viagogo's tech stack, with Nayaab Islam, who had been running Viagogo's technology teams since 2014, promoted to StubHub president. During the consolidation, Viagogo's and StubHub's legal departments were combined.

Operations
The Viagogo brand facilitates the sale of live sport, music, and entertainment tickets through an online platform. The company charges a variable booking fee on top of ticket price, and a service fee from sellers. Viagogo has a policy to "provide comparable replacement tickets or a refund".

Along with partnerships with entertainers and music festivals, the company has partnerships with various sports properties.

Pricing and sales tactics
The company has been criticized for its use of "drip pricing" in certain countries, where not all charges are shown until the end of a transaction. According to Swedish newspaper Göteborgs-Posten, during purchases of secondhand tickets in 2018, one price was shown up front, while additional costs such as value-added tax or booking fees were shown to buyers later in the checkout process. The newspaper criticized the practice as disingenuous. In 2018, a CMA order dictated that Viagogo's UK portal include all-in pricing to make the platform more transparent to customers.

At that time of the CMA order, customers were presented with several messages about tickets being about to run out and in the user interface, the "continue" button jumped and a timer kept counting down. According to executive Chris Miller, the messages were intended to show customers they were visiting a "dynamic market place" and helped buyers "make an informed decision".

During a test where three tickets were purchased, the average transaction took about ten minutes to complete which did not leave time to read the purchase conditions. Once the transactions were completed, the average price paid was about twice that charged by official ticket sellers.

In January 2008, the The Telegraph wrote that Viagogo and Stubhub and its "rivals at Seatwave and Get Me In...introduced a level of respectability...to a business that until recently was dominated by rogue traders who sold tickets...at vastly inflated prices," in the UK. In later years, Viagogo has been criticized for allowing sellers to set prices at extremely high markups, as well as other sales practices.

In 2018, the Swedish Consumer Agency received 132 reports about the company, making it the seventh most reported business operating in Sweden. A frequent criticism was that customers felt stressed and pressured into finishing their purchases. Pressure marketing and countdown timers were removed from the UK website in 2018. In response to a 2021 New Zealand Herald article criticizing highly priced Lorde tickets being resold through the site, Viagogo stated that "tickets that are listed at unreasonable prices get the most media attention but rarely, if ever, sell."

Legal action
They have also faced criticism after they resold charity tickets to an Ed Sheeran cancer benefit concert at highly inflated prices.

In early 2011, Viagogo sold personalised tickets for Take That's 2011 Progress tour to German customers. Some people were not able to enter the concerts in Hamburg and Munich. A German court banned Viagogo from claiming that the validity of the Take That tickets is “100% guaranteed”.

In August 2017, the Australian Competition & Consumer Commission launched legal action against Viagogo with "allegations it made false or misleading representations, and engaged in misleading or deceptive conduct by failing to disclose substantial fees included in the price of tickets."

In August 2018, New Zealand's Commerce Commission sued Viagogo after it sold non-existent tickets for a Bruno Mars concert for NZ$700. 

The company is the only ticket resale site to have refused to work with Ed Sheeran to prevent ticket touts reselling tickets for his tours. 

In the United States, in August 2020 Viagogo faced litigation over its pandemic refund policy, with fans arguing that Viagogo had improperly classified certain shows as postponed instead of canceled to avoid paying refunds. With Viagogo refuting the claims, class action status of the lawsuit was refused by a Florida judge in July 2021 after a motion by Viagogo Entertainment Inc.

In October 2020, the Australian Competition & Consumer Commission fined Viagogo AU$7 million for misleading consumers, stating that they were an "official" seller of tickets to particular events, that certain tickets were scarce and for failing to disclose a 27.6% booking fee until late into the booking process.

In 2021, complaints were received by the agency WellingtonNZ concerning Viagogo overpricing tickets to the musical Jersey Boys and the art event Van Gogh Alive. As at February 2021 the New Zealand Commerce Commission is continuing to pursue legal action against Viagogo for false representations about ticket prices, their scarcity and the validity of tickets sold.

UK government
They were involved in a legal battle with the UK Rugby Football Union (RFU) after they sold tickets which the RFU had forbidden from being resold for profit. Viagogo lost the initial trial and an appeal in the lower courts in December 2011, resulting in the issuing of a Norwich Pharmacal order.

After the company failed to appear before the Culture, Media and Sport Select Committee of the UK Parliament in March 2017, Hodgson and fellow committee member Nigel Adams visited its London headquarters the following July, but the party was turned away.

On 27 November 2018, the UK Competition & Markets Authority stated that Viagogo had, effective 17 January 2019, agreed to perform a "comprehensive overhaul" of its services in order to improve their transparency, and strengthen the guarantees it provides to consumers. Among other changes Viagogo agreed to list the identity of the seller and whether they are a professional trader (defined as performing more than 100 sales in a year), as well as seat numbers and the original face value of the ticket, and any risk that the ticketholder may be turned away due to resale restrictions. In addition, the company was required to cease using misleading indications of how many seats remain for an event, and not to advertise ticket sales for events whose ticketing policies restrict resale.

In May 2018, the UK's Minister for Culture, Communications and Creative Industries, Margot James, told BBC Radio 5 Live listeners planning to buy from secondary ticket sites, "don't choose Viagogo - they are the worst". She gave this advice after the  Advertising Standards Authority asked National Trading Standards to investigate Viagogo's alleged breaches of UK advertising rules about making any additional fees clear. Viagogo is no longer under investigation by trading standards after complying with the ASA ruling.

In August 2018, the UK Competition & Markets Authority confirmed it would be seeking court action against Viagogo following concerns that it is breaching consumer protection law. In July 2019, the UK Competition and Marketing Authority began legal proceedings against Viagogo for contempt of court as a result of the company ignoring repeated warnings to comply with consumer law.

Legal and government actions

See also
 Better Online Tickets Sales Act
 List of United Kingdom Supreme Court cases
 Online ticket brokering

References

External links

Ticket sales companies
Companies based in Geneva
Companies based in London
Internet properties established in 2006
2006 establishments in England
Online marketplaces of the United Kingdom